Marlon Alberto González (born July 17, 1989) is a Colombian footballer who most recently played for Deportes Palmira in Colombia.

He can play as Striker and was a runner-up of the Copa Mustang in 2006 with Deportivo Cali. He also played for Córdoba FC and Giradot FC in Colombia.

Honors
Champion with Deportivo Cali In Torneo Nacional de Ligas Champion with Cali en Torneo Internacional en Italia

External links
 BDFA profile

Deportivo Cali footballers
Living people
1989 births
Association football forwards
Colombian footballers